Chalus (mazandarani: Chāles ;romanized: Chālūs, Chaloos, Chalousse, Chalous, and Čâlus) is a city in Mazandaran Province in north of Iran.

About 

It serves as the county seat for Chalus County. According to the 2006 census, it has a population of 44,618, in 12,791 families.

The people residing in Chalus speak Mazanderani language. In the west of Chalus, the dialect of Kalarestaqi is spoken and in the east of Chalus, the dialect of Kojuri.

Mazandarani people have a background in Tabari ethnicity and speak Mazandarni. Their origin goes back to Tapuri people. So their land was called Tapuria, the land of Tapuris. Tapuris were made to migrate to the south coast of the Caspian Sea during the Achaemenid dynasty. 

The native people of Sari, shahi, babol, Amol, Nowshahr, Chalus, and Tonekabon are Mazandarani people and speak the Mazandarani language.

The eastern Gilaki is spoken in the entire valley of the Čālūs river, though some Kurdish tribes were established in the yeylāq of Kojūr and Kalārdašt in the Qajar period.

Chalus is a major vacation destination for Iranians during holidays for its nice weather and natural attractions. One of the great attractions of Chalus is the mountainous road leading to Chalus, widely known as Chalus Road. This city has a reputation for a number of villages, one of which is called Shahrak-e Namak Abrud. This village offers a variety of different entertaining activities, such as a cable car, offering a view of the surrounding mountains.

Location
The city is in the Mazandaran Province in northern Iran. The bordering counties are Noshahr to the east, Tonekabon to the west in Mazandaran province and Tehran province to the south. It sits on the Chalus River by the Caspian.

Climate
Chalus has a humid subtropical climate (Köppen: Cfa, Trewartha: Cf), with warm, humid summers and cool, damp winters.

History
Chalus used to be called "Salus" or "Shalus". It has a long history of rebels and fights with regional rulers or occupying foreign forces. Chalus used to have a large silk factory that was active from 1936 to 1958, and exported fabrics and other silk products to different countries.

Chalus is part of the Kelarestaq area of Ruyan (Tabaristan). Ruyan was an ancient land in the west of Mazandaran Province during the Baduspanids era. This land includes Kojur, Kelarestaq and Tonekabon. The city of Kojur was the centre of the land of the Ruyans. Ruyan has always been part of the Tabaristan, nowadays called Mazandaran province. The Ruyan was also called the Rostamdār, Ostandār and Rostamdele.

Notable sites 
Gole Sorkhi, Kaakh (The Palace), Chalus Mahalleh, Radyo Darya, Dahgiri, Sheykh Ghotb are among the most notable neighborhoods of Chalus.

The Taliesin Associated Architects (Frank Lloyd Wright Foundation) had three buildings built in Iran, one of which was the summer residence of Shams Pahlavi known as Mehrafarin Palace in Chalus (presently occupied by the local police).

References

 
Populated places in Chalus County
Cities in Mazandaran Province
Populated places on the Caspian Sea